Charles Henry Wilson (10 February 1904 – 1994) was an English professional footballer who played as a full-back.

References

1904 births
1994 deaths
People from Cleethorpes
English footballers
Association football fullbacks
Cleethorpes Town F.C. players
Grimsby Town F.C. players
AFC Bournemouth players
Grantham Town F.C. players
Peterborough United F.C. players
English Football League players